Raymond "Ray" Santiago (born June 15, 1984 in South Bronx, New York) is an American actor of Puerto Rican descent.

Early life
Santiago graduated in 2002 from Fiorello H. LaGuardia High School for the Arts in New York City.

Career 
Raymond Santiago played Jorge Villalobos in the film Meet the Fockers, and had minor roles in 2005's Dirty Deeds and 2006's Accepted. He also starred as Michelle Rodriguez's brother, Tiny Guzman in the 2000 film Girlfight, as Lardo in 2009's Endless Bummer and as Alberto in Suburban Gothic.

He also played in the 2006 film The Sasquatch Dumpling Gang (also known as The Sasquatch Gang), alongside Justin Long, and in American Son along Nick Cannon. He also appeared in the 2011 film In Time. Santiago appeared in episodes of the television series My Name is Earl, Crossing Jordan, Law & Order: LA and Dexter. In the Ash vs. Evil Dead television series from 2015-2018, he portrayed Pablo Simon Bolivar, an immigrant co-worker who becomes Ash's sidekick.

Filmography

Films

Television

Video Games

References

External links

 

1984 births
Living people
Male actors from New York City
Hispanic and Latino American male actors
American male film actors
American male television actors
People from the Bronx
American gay actors
American people of Puerto Rican descent
LGBT people from New York (state)
LGBT Hispanic and Latino American people
21st-century American male actors